Sister Olive (foaled 1918) was an Australian racehorse that won the 1921 Melbourne Cup.

Racing career

After finishing 4th in the 1921 Caulfield Cup, Sister Olive won the Melbourne Cup as a three-year-old in the same year, with a three length margin. Her win was only the third and, as of August 2021, the most recent by a three-year-old filly. Starting at odds of 16/1 and carrying 6 st. 9 lbs. (42.18 kg) she beat a field of 25, including Eurythmic, the favourite that finished last. Before the race, jockey Ted O'Sullivan considered her a "a good thing". It was his first and only Melbourne Cup win.

She came second in the 1922 VRC Australian Cup.

Stud career 
Sister Olive was the dam of Manolive, winner of the C F Orr Stakes and the Perth Cup and Mount of Olives, that won the South Australian Derby.

References

Melbourne Cup winners
1918 racehorse births
Racehorses trained in Australia